Henry Paul (born 1974) is a New Zealand international rugby league & England international rugby union footballer.

Henry Paul may also refer to:

Henry Paul (musician) (born 1949), American southern rock and country singer/songwriter
Henry Howard Paul (1830–1905), American writer, playwright, comic actor and theatrical manager
Henri Paul (died 1997), driver in the accident leading to the death of Diana, Princess of Wales
Henry Paull (1824–1898), British Conservative Party politician and barrister

See also
Paul Henry (disambiguation)